Ligüerre de Ara is a locality located in the municipality of Fiscal, Aragon, in Huesca province, Aragon, Spain. As of 2020, it has a population of 36.

Geography 
Ligüerre de Ara is located 76km northeast of Huesca.

References

Populated places in the Province of Huesca